The A26 is a  long French motorway connecting Calais and Troyes. It is also known as the Autoroute des Anglais (Motorway of the English) as its length forms the first part of the main route from the Dover-Calais ferries and the Channel Tunnel towards Southern and Eastern France and the Cote d'Azur. The motorway is used by a high proportion of British cars, particularly during the summer holiday season. The A26 between Calais and Arras (in conjunction with the A1 autoroute) is part of one of the two main routes between London and Paris, the other being the A16.

The road forms part of European route E-15 and E-17. South of its junction with the A29 autoroute the A26 is part of the Grand contournement de Paris.

History of the A26

The A26 was conceived in the 1960s as an upgrade to the "Grand Itineraire" Calais-Vitry-le-François which followed mostly the N44.

The first part of the motorway  opened in December 1976 with the  23 km section from junction 5 at Lilliers to the A21 exit at Lievin. Subsequently, the 261 km Calais-Reims stretch was opened in stages, the final one completed in March 1989.

By the time the 96 km southern extension connecting the A4 autoroute and A5 autoroute opened in June 1992 it was the final link in the first continuous motorway route from Calais to Marseille and the Cote d'Azur that completely bypassed the Paris area with its associated congestion, reducing driving time from Calais to Lyon by approximately 90 minutes to around 6 hours. This section also made up the final part of an uninterrupted motorway route between the major cities of Lyon/Marseille and Lille without having to drive via either Paris or Belgium.

The road in its current form was completed in 2010 with the short extension southward from the old A4 autoroute which ran through the centre of Reims (now marked A344) to the new A4 southern bypass of the city (Contournement de Reims Sud) along with the construction of the new closed system peage station at Ormes.

Route
The northern end of the motorway starts just to the southeast of Calais, at a junction with the A16 (5 km east of the Eurotunnel exit) and A216/N216 (which links to the Port of Calais and the car ferries). From there it runs southeast past Saint-Omer, Béthune, Lens and Arras. Near Arras is a major intersection with the A1, which runs south to Paris.

The A26 continues southeast, passing near Cambrai, Saint-Quentin and Laon before meeting the A4 at Reims.

The A4 then continues eastwards to Metz, Nancy and Strasbourg and the A26 branches to the south toward Troyes and Lyon. The current southern terminus of the A26 is just to the southeast of Troyes where the motorway meets the A5, which provides a direct motorway connection to Dijon, Lyon, southern and eastern France as well as Milan and The Alps.

The A26 is a toll (peage) motorway for all but junctions 1 to 3 (A16 to St. Omer) and a short section circling western Reims. The vast majority is maintained by SANEF except the very southern end south of junction 21 which is operated by APRR. There are 3 major (closed system) peage stations at Setques (St. Omer), Courcy (Reims Nord) and Ormes (Reims Sud).

Regions traversed

•Hauts-de-France 
•Grand Est

Departements traversed

•Pas-de-Calais (62)
•Nord (59)
•Aisne (02)
•Somme (80)
•Marne (51)
•Aube (10)

Radio coverage 
The A26 is completely covered by two zones of SANEF 107.7 traffic coverage: North of Reims, it is in the northern zone and South of Reims, it is within the eastern zone.

Characteristics

The A26 is 2x2 lanes throughout and passes close to some of the most well known World War I battle sites as well as through the vineyards of the Champagne-Ardennes area (which is now part of the Grand-Est region). It is built on mainly relatively flat, agricultural land and has many long, fairly straight sections and few steep gradients as a result. It crosses over, as well as through the valleys of the rivers Aa, Lys, Somme and Marne as well as le Méridienne verte, a millennium project to plant a line of trees the length of France along the Paris Meridian.

The northern section of the motorway can be prone to strong crosswinds and heavy downpours and there are large wind turbines and windsocks visible throughout the whole length of the road. The motorway is characterised by European signage in brown pointing out sites of historical and cultural interest along its route. It is usually not one of the more congested routes on the French autoroute network. Like many autoroutes of France the A26 is completely unlit, relying on heavily fluorescent road markings to guide drivers at night.

The road is well surfaced and maintained in comparison to most other countries' motorways. Signage is typical of the French system where destination is given strong prominence over road designation and signs are completely capitalised. After each junction there are two marker boards at the side of the road: Firstly, a white sign with information about the next exit with distance to it and the destinations it serves and secondly, a blue sign with distances to the motorway's main and onward destinations. Overhead gantries display destinations before the larger junctions and digital overhead gantries provide live information on anything from traffic, accidents and breakdowns to the weather. As with other autoroutes in France, along the central reservation every one hundred metres is a small sign showing the distance from the start of the motorway, starting with 0.1 km at Calais and ending with 394.0 km at Troyes. Along the 36 km stretch merged with the A4 these signs are not present as the distance markers for the A4 itself are given priority. They resume once the motorways split with the 36 km difference in distance taken into account.

In order to continue along the A26 northbound or southbound after the 36 km stretch merged with the A4 autoroute, drivers must take the exit slips from the A4 at Reims (northbound) or Châlons-en-Champagne (southbound).

Since the mid 2000s the final aire on the northbound side (Nortkerque) has been permanently closed due to its use by migrants as a boarding point onto parked freight vehicles heading for the UK. Since 2018 the Aire de Villefleur, the penultimate northbound aire has also been closed for the same reason. There are semi-permanent red and white plastic barriers in place to prevent entry to the aires. There is signage to warn northbound motorists that St. Hilaire-Cottes is the final chance to stop before the end of the motorway.

Opening Dates

03 12 1976 : Section Lillers - Liévin (Junction 5 - A21)

23 09 1977 : Section Liévin - Plouvain (A21 - A1)

20 12 1981 : Section Setques - Lillers (Junctions 3 to 5)

10 11 1982 : Section Plouvain - La Vacquerie (A1 - Junction 9)

11 08 1983 : Section Nordausques - Setques (Junctions 2 to 3)

27 07 1985 : Section La Vacquerie - Saint-Quentin-Nord (Junctions 9 to 10)

29 11 1985 : Section Saint-Quentin-Nord - Grugies (Junctions 10 to 11)

07 07 1987 : Section Grugies - Laon (Junctions 11 to 13)

16 12 1988 : Section Calais - Nordausques (A16 - Junction 2)

24 03 1989 : Section Laon - Thillois (Junction 13 - A344)

30 06 1992 : Section Les Grandes-Loges - Montaulin (A4-Est - A5)

23 11 2010 : Section Thillois - Ormes (A344 - A4-Ouest)

Junctions

Future
For some years there have been plans to extend the A26 to Auxerre after 2025. and perhaps to Bourges thereafter but that is not programmed before 2030. The extension would, if completed, replace N77 and N151 as part of the second version of the Grand contournement de Paris, upgrading the south-eastern section of the ring road to motorway standard.

References

External links

A26 autoroute in Saratlas

A26